Will Brice (born October 24, 1974) is a former American football punter. He played for the St. Louis Rams in 1997 and for the Cincinnati Bengals in 1999.

References

1974 births
Living people
American football punters
Virginia Cavaliers football players
St. Louis Rams players
Amsterdam Admirals players
Cincinnati Bengals players